Rachel Walker (born 15 May 1979 in Worcester, Worcestershire) is an English field hockey international, who was a member of the England and Great Britain women's field hockey team since making her England debut in June 2000 against Ireland. She is nicknamed Wacker. She graduated from Birmingham University in Physiotherapy in 2000.

References

sports-reference
   Profile

External links
 

1979 births
English female field hockey players
Living people
Olympic field hockey players of Great Britain
Field hockey players at the 2008 Summer Olympics
Commonwealth Games silver medallists for England
Sportspeople from Worcester, England
Alumni of the University of Birmingham
Commonwealth Games medallists in field hockey
Field hockey players at the 2002 Commonwealth Games
Medallists at the 2002 Commonwealth Games